Vladimir Voskoboinikov (born 2 February 1983) is a retired Estonian professional footballer who played as a centre forward.

Club career

Voskoboinikov began his career at Puuma in Estonia where he played from 1991 until 2000.

At the age of 18, Voskoboinikov continued his professional career with Levadia. He had a spell in Belgium with Jupiler League club Brussels and a short loan at Eupen before he moving back to Estonia.

He was initially on loan at Russian First Division club Torpedo Moscow, but in July 2007 he signed a two-year contract.

On 27 March 2009, he joined Swedish Superettan side Syrianska. Although he still had a running contract with FC Torpedo, he was given a free transfer, due to the rule that disallowing foreign players in the Russian Second Division.

In January 2010, he joined Azerbaijan Premier League club Neftchi Baku.

In August 2010, he joined Levadia.

In February 2011, he joined Khimki.

Statistics

International career

Voskoboinikov has been capped 36 times For Estonia, scoring 4 goals. He made his national team debut on 2 June 2007 against Croatia in a UEFA Euro 2008 qualification. He scored his first national team goal on 18 November 2008, in a 1–0 victory over Moldova in a Mayors Cup match.

International goals

Honours

Club

Levadia
 Meistriliiga: 2004, 2006
 Estonian Cup: 2001–02, 2003–04

Brussels
 Belgian Second Division: 2003–04

Nõmme Kalju
 Estonian Cup: 2014–15

FCI Tallinn
 Meistriliiga: 2016
 Estonian Supercup: 2017

Individual

 Meistriliiga top goalscorer: 2013

References

External links

 
 

1983 births
Footballers from Tallinn
Living people
Estonian footballers
Estonia international footballers
Estonian people of Russian descent
FCI Levadia Tallinn players
Estonian expatriate footballers
Expatriate footballers in Belgium
Estonian expatriate sportspeople in Belgium
R.W.D.M. Brussels F.C. players
Expatriate footballers in Russia
Estonian expatriate sportspeople in Russia
FC Khimki players
FC Luch Vladivostok players
FC Torpedo Moscow players
Expatriate footballers in Sweden
Estonian expatriate sportspeople in Sweden
Expatriate footballers in Azerbaijan
Estonian expatriate sportspeople in Azerbaijan
Azerbaijan Premier League players
Expatriate footballers in Georgia (country)
Estonian expatriate sportspeople in Georgia (country)
Erovnuli Liga players
FC Dinamo Tbilisi players
Qingdao F.C. players
China League One players
Expatriate footballers in China
Estonian expatriate sportspeople in China
Association football forwards
FCI Tallinn players
FC Puuma Tallinn players
Neftçi PFK players
Meistriliiga players